Naring is a locality in northern Victoria, Australia. The locality includes the former locality of Naringaningalook. It is in the local government area of Shire of Moira.

Naringaningalook West post office opened on 8 September 1914 and was closed on 27 February 1965. Naringaningalook East post office opened on 8 September 1914 and was closed on 14 December 1915.

References

External links

Towns in Victoria (Australia)
Shire of Moira